Anastasios ("Tasos") Bavelas (Greek: Αναστάσιος ("Τάσος") Μπαβέλας; born 27 February 1968 in Athens, Attica) is a male former tennis player from Greece.

Bavelas represented his native country in the doubles competition at the 1988 Summer Olympics in Seoul, partnering George Kalovelonis. The pair was eliminated in the first round there. He also competed at the 1992 Summer Olympics.

The left-hander Bavelas represented Greece in the Davis Cup from 1984–1994, posting a 15-13 record in singles and a 5–3 record in doubles.

Bevalas played in some dozen minor circuit events during the 1980s.  He highest ranking in singles was world No. 451, which he reached in November 1984.  His highest doubles ranking was World No. 438, which he reached in July 1986.

Bavelas has been praised as the greatest natural tennis talent Greece has produced.

External links
 
 
 
 
 

1968 births
Living people
Greek male tennis players
Olympic tennis players of Greece
Sportspeople from Athens
Tennis players at the 1988 Summer Olympics
Tennis players at the 1992 Summer Olympics